Aitovo (Ayıt) is a rural locality (a selo) in and the administrative centre of Aitovsky Selsoviet, Bizhbulyaksky District, Bashkortostan, Russia. The population was 1,176 as of 2010. There are 22 streets.

Geography 
Aitovo is located 23 km south of Bizhbulyak (the district's administrative centre) by road. Yelbulaktamak is the nearest rural locality.

References 

Rural localities in Bizhbulyaksky District